The Communist League is a New Zealand communist party.

History
The party was founded in 1969 by students from Victoria University of Wellington, and was originally named the Socialist Action League. The new party rejected the more established groups such as the Communist Party as too authoritarian, conservative, and unimaginative, but at the same time, rejected many of the newer communist groups in New Zealand as disorganised and unfocused. It was aligned with the Fourth International (FI), an international grouping of Trotskyist parties. The party achieved a certain amount of public recognition for its role in protests against the Vietnam War, and regularly engaged in protests against adventurist United States foreign policy, South African apartheid, in defence of the pro-choice side of the abortion debate, as well as supporting LGBT rights in New Zealand, during the 1970s and 1980s. During those decades, the SAL maintained a newspaper of its own, Socialist Action. According to the National Library of New Zealand serials catalogue, it ran from 1969 to 1988.

In the 1980s, the Socialist Workers Party in the United States broke away from Trotskyism, and left the FI. A number of other parties in FI also chose to leave, including the Socialist Action League in New Zealand. Those members of the Socialist Action League who did not agree with this departure from Trotskyism and the FI were expelled or resigned. Later, the Socialist Action League renamed itself the Communist League, following the pattern of the other pro-SWP parties that had left the FI. Today, the party is still associated with the Socialist Workers Party's so-called Pathfinder tendency.

The League holds frequent public meetings called Militant Labour Forums.
The Militant newspaper and books published by Pathfinder Press are distributed from the Pathfinder Bookshop in the Auckland suburb of Onehunga.

In the 2002 elections, it stood two candidates, and gained their best result in 12 years with 171 votes.  In the 2005 elections it also ran two candidates, but received only 107 votes.

The party stood two candidates in the 2008 election, who gained 58 and 16 votes.  The party also stood two candidates in the 2010 Auckland City Council elections.

The party stood Annalucia Vermunt as its candidate for Mayor of Auckland at the 2013 local body elections. Vermunt received 856 votes. The party stood Baskaran Appu as its candidate for City Councillor in the Manukau Ward. Appu received 1,154 votes.

The party stood two candidates in the 2014 election. The League's two candidates were Felicity Coggan, who received 92 votes in the electorate of Maungakiekie, and Annalucia Vermunt, who received 43 votes in the electorate of Manukau East.  These figures represented 0.28% and 0.17% respectively of the total valid vote in those seats. The 92 votes received by Coggan was the best result for the League in a General Election since 2002.

The League ran Patrick Brown as their candidate for the 2017 Mount Albert by-election. Brown received 16 votes. Brown's press release stated "...my campaign presents a working class programme and revolutionary course to overthrow capitalist rule." It subsequently stood two candidates in the 2017 election, winning 109 votes. It is standing candidates in the 2020 general election.

Electoral results (1990–2020)

Auckland mayor (1990–2019)

See also

Political parties in New Zealand

References

Political parties established in 1969
Communist parties in New Zealand